The 2021–22 season was Arsenal Women's Football Club's 36th season of competitive football. The club participated in the Women's Super League, the FA Cup, the League Cup and the Champions League.

Squad statistics 
Statistics as of 8 May 2022, includes postponed matches of the 2020–21 Women's FA Cup.

Appearances and goals

Goalscorers

Disciplinary record

Clean sheets

Transfers, loans, and other signings

Transfers in

Contract extensions

Transfers out

Loans out

Current injuries

Suspensions

Pre-season

Competitions

Women's Super League

League table

Results summary

Results by matchday

Matches

FA Cup 

As a member of the top two tiers, Arsenal enters the FA Cup in the fourth round.

League Cup 

Arsenal automatically qualified for the quarter-finals of the League Cup because of reaching the Champions League group stage.

UEFA Women's Champions League

Qualifying rounds

First round

Second round

Groupstage

Matches

Standings

Play-offs

Quarter-finals

Personal Awards

Arsenal Women Player of the Season 
 First place: Beth Mead
 Second place: Leah Williamson
 Third place: Vivianne Miedema

Arsenal Women Goal of the Season 
 First place: Katie McCabe (against Liverpool F.C. Women)
 Second place: Katie McCabe (against Aston Villa W.F.C.)
 Third place: Beth Mead (against Chelsea F.C. Women)

BBC Women's Footballer of the Year 
 Vivianne Miedema

Football Supporters' Association Women's Player of the Year 
 Vivianne Miedema

FIFA FIFPRO Women's World 11 
 Vivianne Miedema

Monthly awards

FA Women's Super League Player of the Month 
 Beth Mead, September 2021
 Katie McCabe, October 2021

PFA Fans' Player of the Month 
 Beth Mead, November 2021

FA Women's Super League Goal of the Month 
 Katie McCabe, October 2021

FA Women's Super League Manager of the Month 
 Jonas Eidevall, September 2021
 Jonas Eidevall, October 2021

Arsenal Goal of the Month award 
The Goal of the Month awards were chosen via open-access polls on the club's official website and include contenders from both the men's and women's teams.

References

External links 
 

Arsenal W.F.C. seasons
Arsenal